Station Hill may refer to:

Station Hill, Reading, a proposed redevelopment project in Reading, Berkshire
Station Hill, Saint Vincent and the Grenadines, a town located on the island of Mayreau

See also 
 Hill Station